was a short-lived province located in Hokkaidō. It corresponded to modern-day Hidaka Subprefecture.

History
After 1869, the northern Japanese island was known as Hokkaido; and regional administrative subdivisions were identified, including Hidaka Province.
August 15, 1869 Hidaka Province established with 7 districts
1872 Census finds a population of 6,574
1882 Provinces dissolved in Hokkaidō.

Districts
Saru (沙流郡)
Niikappu (新冠郡)
Shizunai (静内郡)
Mitsuishi (三石郡)
Urakawa (浦河郡)
Samani (様似郡)
Horoizumi (幌泉郡)

Notes

References
 Nussbaum, Louis-Frédéric and Käthe Roth. (2005).  Japan encyclopedia. Cambridge: Harvard University Press. ;  OCLC 58053128

Other websites 

  Murdoch's map of provinces, 1903

1869 establishments in Japan
1882 disestablishments in Japan
Former provinces of Japan